In Theatre is the third album from the parody duo Amateur Transplants, a live album released on iTunes on 20 June 2009. It first hit Number 1 in the iTunes Comedy chart on 10 July 2009.

It was recorded at a live performance in London in January 2009.

Track listing
All songs written by Adam Kay and Suman Biswas.

"First Bit" (5:30)
"Second Bit" (5:21)
"Third Bit" (4:11)
"Fourth Bit" (4:19)
"Fifth Bit" (6:00)
"Sixth Bit" (5:17)
"Seventh Bit" (5:53)
"Eighth Bit" (6:05)
"Ninth Bit" (6:58)
"Tenth Bit" (6:28)

First Bit
"King Of The Dead" - Bad Day by Daniel Powter
"My Name Is" - My Name Is by Eminem
"Information Technology" - "9 to 5" by Dolly Parton
"Wheat Restricted Diet" - I Predict A Riot by Kaiser Chiefs
"Dorsal Horn Concerto" - "Rondo" (3rd movement) from Horn Concerto No. 4 in E flat major K.495 by Wolfgang Amadeus Mozart

Second Bit
"Anaesthetist's Hymn" - Total Eclipse Of The Heart by Bonnie Tyler
"Measles, Mumps and Rubella" - Umbrella by Rihanna
"Gay Stripper" - Day Tripper by The Beatles
"Letter 'B'" - Let It Be by The Beatles
"OCD" - Sit Down by James

Third Bit
"John Barrowman" - Piano Man by Billy Joel
"All The Stuff In Ribena" - Don't Cry For Me Argentina from Evita
"A Broken Leg And Depression" - Under Pressure by Queen and David Bowie
"Take A Look At Me Nan" - Against All Odds (Take a Look at Me Now) by Phil Collins

Fourth Bit
"Medical School Finance" - Son Of A Preacher Man by Dusty Springfield
"Live-In Au Pair" - Livin' On A Prayer by Bon Jovi
"Paediatrics" - Patience by Take That
"Colostomy" - (They Long to Be) Close to You by The Carpenters

Fifth Bit
"Nutrition Clinic B (Jalapeno, Halle Berry, Halitosis, Halal Butcher)" - Hallelujah by Leonard Cohen
"Do They Know It's Dinnertime?" - Do They Know It's Christmas? by Band Aid

Sixth Bit
"Joseph's Song" - Gold by Spandau Ballet
"Christmas Number 12" - The Twelve Days of Christmas
"Uhhh Uhhh Uhhh Uhhh" - Mmm Mmm Mmm Mmm by Crash Test Dummies

Seventh Bit
"Diarrhoea" - Mamma Mia by ABBA
"The Time Of The Month" - Good Riddance (Time of Your Life) by Green Day
"Respiratory Clinic A" - Easy by Commodores
"Well Man Clinic" - Don't Know Why by Norah Jones
"Respiratory Clinic B" - The Girl From Ipanema by Astrud Gilberto
"Department of Surgery" - Complicated by Avril Lavigne

Eighth Bit
"I Get My Dick Out Of You" - I Get A Kick Out Of You by Jamie Cullum
"7 Dwarfs" - 7 Days by Craig David
"Sing a Song of Sixpence" (based on traditional poem Sing a Song of Sixpence)
"Eleven" - Heaven by Bryan Adams
"Couples Counselling C" - Breakfast at Tiffany's by Deep Blue Something
"Footloose" - Footloose by Kenny Loggins
"Couples Counselling B" - Build Me Up Buttercup by The Foundations

Ninth Bit
"Couples Counselling A" - Sorry Seems to Be the Hardest Word by Elton John and Bernie Taupin
"Couples Counselling D" - The Bare Necessities from The Jungle Book
"Urology Clinic A" - Ob-la-di, Ob-la-da by The Beatles
"What I Went to SKL 4" - What I Go to School For by Busted
"One Hand" - Hand In My Pocket by Alanis Morissette
"Libel Case" - Grace Kelly by Mika

Tenth Bit
"Circle Line" - Circle of Life from The Lion King
"London Underground (Part I)" - Going Underground by The Jam
"Paul Weller" - Yellow by Coldplay
"London Underground (Part II)" - Going Underground by The Jam
"Paracetamoxyfrusebendroneomycin" - Supercalifragilisticexpialidocious from Mary Poppins

2009 live albums
Amateur Transplants albums